The Dutch Hill/Cohocton Wind Farm is a 125 Megawatt wind farm in Cohocton, New York. It uses 50 2.5 MW turbines of the Clipper "Liberty" type, which were the largest found in the United States when they were put up for sale. The wind farm provides power for about 50,000 Northeastern homes. The wind farm is located in Steuben County. It was installed in 2008 and was developed and operated by First Wind.

As of fall 2021 the 50 windmills are being replaced and should be complete by early 2022. Being replaced because the Liberty windmill company went out of business and no parts.

See also

 New York energy law

References

Energy infrastructure completed in 2008
Wind farms in New York (state)
Buildings and structures in Steuben County, New York
2008 establishments in New York (state)